Anirudh Thapa (born 15 January 1998) is an Indian professional footballer who plays as a midfielder for Indian Super League club Chennaiyin, which he captains, and the India national football team.

Club career

Early life and youth career 
Thapa was born in Dehradun, Uttarakhand, where he started his schooling at St. Joseph's Academy. He began playing football at the age of 10 at the St. Stephen's Football Academy in Chandigarh. After spending time with the India U14 side, he was selected to join the AIFF Regional Academy in Kalyani in 2012. As he moved up the national youth team ranks, Thapa moved into the AIFF Elite Academy where he became captain of the side in the I-League U19. In April 2016 Thapa, along with four other players, was selected to join French Ligue 2 side Metz on a short training-stint which was sponsored by Indian Super League side Chennaiyin.

Indian Super League

Chennaiyin 
On 1 July 2016, ISL club Chennaiyin signed Thapa along with four other players on a long term deal. Thapa was named in the squad as a developmental player for the 2016 Indian Super League season. In November 2016, due to the injury to Dhanachandra Singh, which ruled the midfielder out for the rest of the ISL season, Thapa was put into the Chennaiyin squad as a replacement. He made his professional debut for the team on 1 December 2016, in his side's final match of the season against Goa. He started the match and played 67 minutes which ended in a 5-4 loss. He almost scored his first goal but unfortunately it was given as an own goal.

I-League

Minerva Punjab (loan) 
On 27 December 2016, after the conclusion of the 2016 Indian Super League season, Thapa signed for Minerva Punjab of the I-League on loan for the 2016–17 I-League season. He made his debut for the club against Mohun Bagan on 17 January 2017 in a 4-0 loss. On 4 February 2017, he scored his first professional goal of his career against Mumbai in a 2-1 win, which also was the club's first ever win in the top flight. He made his last appearance for the club on 23 April 2017, against East Bengal. He finished the season with 1 goal while playing 14 matches, as the club finished second from bottom in the league, avoiding relegation to the I-League 2nd Division only by head-to-head points to Mumbai.

Return to Chennaiyin

2017–18 season 
Thapa returned to Chennaiyin on 31 May 2017, after his loan spell with Minerva Punjab. He was named in the squad for the 2017-18 Indian Super League season which commenced from 17 November 2017. He made his first appearance of the season against Pune City on 3 December 2017, coming on as a 76th-minute substitute for Bikramjit Singh in a 1-0 win. He scored his first goal for Chennaiyin against NorthEast United in a 3-1 loss. On 25 January 2018, he produced a man of the match performance against defending champions ATK for which he received great plaudits. Former Chennaiyin head coach John Gregory even stated Thapa "as the next big thing in Indian football". On 10 March 2018, he scored his second goal of the season against Goa in the 1st leg of the semi-final playoffs. He played in the final on 17 March 2018, against Bengaluru, coming on as a substitute as Chennaiyin won by the margin of 3-2, thus winning him his first league title.

2018–19 season 
After his breakthrough season, 2018–19 Indian Super League season was a learning curve for Thapa, who was a regular fixture in the starting line-up. Chennaiyin, with just nine points, finished a lowly 10th on the points table. His form, perhaps, took a hit because of the non-stop football he has played for the past 12 months. He played 18 matches for the club in the ISL season, from which he started 12 of them. He also made 8 appearances for the club in the 2019 AFC Cup, scoring a deflected goal against Abahani on 30 April 2019, but Chennaiyin failed to qualify from the group stage.

2019–20 season 
After a disappointing last season, Chennaiyin qualified for the playoffs by finishing 4th on the points table. Thapa was the centre of their resurgence as he amassed 1 goal and 6 assists during the season. However Chennaiyin lost in the final to ATK by the margin of 3-1 on 14 March 2020. After the conclusion of the season, Thapa stated that "he felt an improvement in his individual game".

2020–21 season 
On 24 November 2020, Thapa scored in the first league match of the 2020–21 Indian Super League season, in 52 seconds against Jamshedpur to become the first Indian goal-scorer of the season. On 4 December 2020, the 22-year old midfielder was injured and substituted in the 16th minute against Bengaluru. He took a knock to his right ankle  He was forced to sit out the 2-1 loss against Mumbai City on 9 December 2020. Fortunately for the club, Thapa returned to full training ahead of its Indian Super League match against NorthEast United on 13 December 2020.

2021-22 season 
For the 2021-22 Indian super league season, Thapa was assigned as the captain of the club. On 29 November 2021, Thapa scored the winning goal against Northeast United as his team won 2-1.

International career
Thapa first represented India at the U14 level. He was part of the U16 side that won the 2013 SAFF U16 Championship and participated in the qualifiers for the AFC U16 Championship. Thapa then went on to represent the U19 side in the SAFF U19 Championship.

On 6 January 2019, Thapa scored his first ever international goal in a 4–1 win against Thailand in the 2019 AFC Asian Cup. He scored the second goal against the same opponent in 2019 King's Cup which India won 1–0.

Career statistics

Club

International

International goals
Scores and results list India's goal tally first.

Honours

Chennaiyin
Indian Super League: 2017–18; runner-up 2019–20.

India
 SAFF Championship: 2021; runner-up: 2018
 Intercontinental Cup: 2017, 2018
 King's Cup third place: 2019

Individual
 AIFF Men Emerging Footballer Of The Year: 2017–2018, 2019–20
 Indian Super League Hero of the Month: February 2023

References

External links 

 Anirudh Thapa at All India Football Federation
Anirudh Thapa at India Super League

1998 births
Living people
Sportspeople from Dehradun
Indian footballers
Chennaiyin FC players
RoundGlass Punjab FC players
Association football midfielders
Footballers from Uttarakhand
Indian Super League players
India youth international footballers
Indian Gorkhas
2019 AFC Asian Cup players
India international footballers
I-League players.